The 2016–17 season was Ergotelis' 87th season in existence and 1st season in the Gamma Ethniki, the third tier of the Greek football league system, after 14 years in which the club competed in professional competitions. Ergotelis also participated in the Gamma Ethniki Cup, a football competition cup in which only the clubs competing in one of the four groups of the Gamma Ethniki can participate. The season marked the beginning of a new era in the club's history, as the previous Football Club opened winding-up proceedings entering into liquidation, a process that allowed the parent sport club G.S. Ergotelis to form a new football department eligible to compete in the Gamma Ethniki under new leadership, free of the financial obligations of the previous administration. The club slogan for the season Ksekiname! literally translates to We begin!. The project was successful, as Ergotelis finished as Champions of Group 4, achieving instant promotion to the Football League, and professional divisions in general.

Players

The following players have departed in mid-season 

Note: Flags indicate national team as has been defined under FIFA eligibility rules. Players and Managers may hold more than one non-FIFA nationality.

Transfers

In

Promoted from youth system

Total spending:  0.00 €

Out 
 
Total income:  €0.0

Expenditure:   €0.0

Managerial changes

Kit
2016−17

|
|Friendlies

|

Pre-season and friendlies

Pre-season friendlies part A

12th Markomichelakis Tournament

Pre-season friendlies part B

Mid-season friendlies

Competitions

Overview 

Last updated: 5 July 2016

Gamma Ethniki

League table

Results summary

Results by Round

Matches 

1. Matchday 9 vs. AEEK INKA, originally meant to be held 20 November 2016, was postponed until 23 November 2016 via a direct order of the HFF, in association with UEFA and FIFA, in response to the arson of Super League Chief Refereeing Officer Georgios Mpikas' house in Ierissos, Chalkidiki.

2. Matchday 11 vs. Agios Ierotheos, originally meant to be held 4 December 2016, was postponed until 14 December 2016 by the HFF, due to Agios Ierotheos not being able to travel by sea to Crete for the match as a result of the Panhellenic Seamen's Federation strike. This strike also affected the Gamma Ethniki Cup match vs. Kifisia which was eventually held on 14 December 2016, thus pushing back Matchday 11 to 4 January 2017.

3. Matchday 14 vs. Ermis Zoniana, originally meant to be held 8 January 2017, was postponed until 22 January 2017 due to severe weather conditions.

4. Due to multiple matches being postponed throughout the season, matchday 16 vs. Proodeftiki, originally meant to be held in January 2017, was postponed until 25 February 2017.

Gamma Ethniki Cup

First round

Match-day 1

Matches

Match-day 2

Matches 

1. Matchday 2 vs. Kifisia, originally meant to be held 13 November 2016, was postponed until 7 December 2016 via a direct order of the HFF, in association with UEFA and FIFA, in response to the arson of Super League Chief Refereeing Officer Georgios Mpikas' house in Ierissos, Chalkidiki. Then, it was once again postponed until 14 December 2016 due to Kifisia not being able to travel by sea to Crete for the match as a result of the Panhellenic Seamen's Federation strike.

Statistics

Goal scorers

Last updated: 5 July 2016

References

Ergotelis
Ergotelis F.C. seasons